Legacy Broadcasting, LLC is a broadcasting company founded in 2014 by Sherry Nelson and her daughter Sara Jane Nelson.

History
Legacy Broadcasting began in 2014 when it announced it would acquire four television stations from Gray Television that had been owned or controlled via joint sales and shared services agreements by Hoak Media. The stations were KAQY, KHAS-TV, and KNDX and its satellite KXND. The stations went silent while the consummation of the transactions were pending. During this period, Gray re-called the stations based on their locations and transferred the stations' primary network affiliations to subchannels of competing stations that they already owned. The sales closed in 2015 and the stations returned to the air under Legacy ownership in the summer of 2015.

On October 1, 2015, Gray announced the sale of Schurz Communications-owned KOTA-TV, the oldest television station in South Dakota, for $1. Gray will transfer the station's ABC affiliation to KEVN-TV but KOTA will remain affiliated with This TV and MeTV at the close of the sale. KOTA satellite KHSD-TV is also included in the sale to Legacy.

On May 21, 2018, Legacy Broadcasting entered an agreement to sell KNHL to Gray for $475,000. Gray intends to turn KNHL into a satellite of its NBC affiliate KSNB-TV. The sale was finalized on March 1, 2019.

On October 13, 2021, it was announced that KHME and KQME would be sold to Gray for $500,000; making KHME a sister station to KOTA-TV and KEVN-LD. The sale was finalized on November 30.

Stations

Current

Former

References

Mass media companies established in 2014
Television broadcasting companies of the United States
2014 establishments in the United States